Emile Cairess (born 27 December 1997) is a British long-distance runner. He won the bronze medal in the 10,000 metres at the 2019 European Under-23 Championships and a silver for the men's race at the 2022 European Cross Country Championships. Cairess is the European record holder for the road 10 miles.

Career
During the under-23 race at the 2018 European Cross Country Championships, Emile Cairess fell over at half-mile stage but managed to move up 59 places for eighth position and a team silver medal.

In January 2022 at the Valencia Ibercaja, he tied Mo Farah's over 10-year-old British 10 kilometres record with his time of 27:44. The 24-year-old set five other personal bests that year (3000 m, 5000 m, 10,000 m, 5 km, half marathon). At the European Cross Country Championships held in Turin, Italy in December, Cairess achieved his best performance up to that point, with silver medal in the men's senior race behind only reigning world 5000 m champion and European record holder in the event Jakob Ingebrigtsen.

On 4 March 2023, Cairess broke Richard Nerurkar's 30-year European 10-mile record (46:02) with a time of 45:57 at the 'Breaking 10' in Barrowford.

Achievements

Competition record

Personal bests
 3000 metres – 7:44.74 (Nembro 2022)
 3000 metres indoor – 	7:59.45 (Manchester 2021)
 5000 metres – 13:26.40 (Heusden-Zolder 2022)
 10,000 metres – 27:34.08 (London 2022)
 Road
 5 kilometres – 13:38 (Herzogenaurach 2022)
 10 kilometres – 27:44 (Valencia 2022)
 10 miles – 45:57 (Barrowford 2023) 
 Half marathon – 1:00:32 (Valencia 2022)

References

External links
 

1997 births
Living people
English male long-distance runners
British male long-distance runners
21st-century British people